Echtra Condla, ("The adventure of Connla") is an Old Irish echtra tale known in two variants from eight manuscripts, the earliest of which has been dated to the 12th C. - the tale may have been written down first as early as the 8th C. The two variants do not diverge sharply from one another, so that a single summary suffices for both.

The tale tells of the 'seduction' of Connla, son of Conn of the Hundred Battles by a woman of the Aos Si. In addition to what seems to be a story from pre-Christian tradition the story also incorporates what has interpreted to be a post-Christian and anti-druidic message from the woman herself, thus foretelling the coming of Christianity.

The echtra contains most of what is known of 'Connla son of Conn of the Hundred Battles', aka 'Connla the Ruddy', or 'Connla the Fair'.

Plot summary
Echtra Condla opens at the Hill of Uisneach, where the tale's eponymous hero, Conle (the Ruddy), is sitting with his father, Conn of the Hundred Battles. A strangely dressed woman appears, and Conle asks of her where she is from.

She explains that she is from the "Land of the Living" (Tír na mBeo), where people feast for ever without effort, and live in peace without sin.

Conn asks Conle who he is talking to, as no one but Conle could see the woman. The woman then replies, stating she invites Conle to the "Plain of Delights" (Mag Mell) where the king is Bóadag, promising that Conle can stay for ever. All heard the woman, but could not see here; Conn then asked his druid Corann for help, since he saw he would lose his own son to the woman. Corann intoned a spell where the woman's voice was heard so that Conle could not see her anymore. The strange woman then leaves, but as she does she tosses an apple to Conle.

Conle survives off of this fruit for an entire month, eschewing all other food and drink. Underlining the Otherworldly nature of this apple, the apple remained whole even after Conle ate from it. Conle then becomes to long to see the woman again.

The woman reappears after this month, this time on the plain of Arcommin. She speaks to Conle and Conn calls for his druid again, but the woman reproaches him, saying he should not resort to druidry. The woman speaks to Conn rebuking the druid, describing his words as lies coming from a demon. Conn notes that Conle will not respond to anyone except the woman, and asks if the woman's word have a hold on him. Conle responds that he is torn between his people and the woman.

The woman then beckons Conle come with her, promising a happy land full only of women and maidens. Conle then jumps into the womans 'crystal ship' (Noi Glano, or Loing Glano), and those left watched it sail away until it was too far to see. [End]

In three manuscripts, a sort of postscript follows, explaining that Art mac Cuinn was also called Art Óenfer (Art the Solitary) because after Conle's departure he was Conn's only son.

Analysis

Linguistic analysis of the texts led McCone to derive that the tale has an 8th C. archetype, and that the versions in the 12th C. Lebor na hUidre derive from 10th C. versions, whilst it is the 14th C. versions in the Yellow Book of Lecan that is closer to the 8th C. "original".

 states that the text should be understood as a literary production of the twelfth century, whatever older strata of tradition may have informed it.

Some scholars see a clear Christian message in this extract :

Other translators render Tráig Máir not as "Great Strand" but as "Great High King", and then infer the text might refer to the Christian God and his "righteous one" to Jesus Christ,  Oskamp argues that the interpretation with Jesus as the Great High King and the "righteous one" as Saint Patrick is good. McCone has interpreted the woman as representing Christianity itself, while others (Olsen, 2013) finds that metaphor too extended.

The woman also fulfills the role of the 'Celtic' sovereignty goddess, as well as retaining the seductive qualities of a pre-Christian goddess.

Legacy
The tale has been retold in modern or modernised form.

See also
Connla Cáem 2nd C. prince mentioned in Lebor Gabála Érenn
Connla, the son of Cú Chulainn

Notes

References

Sources

 , translation from the version in The Book of the Dun Cow, as transcribed in

Further reading

External links
 , online editions
 , primary sources

12th-century books
Old Irish
Irish manuscripts
Irish-language literature